Lyon Mountain Correctional Facility is a former prison in New York in the United States. The prison is located in the western part of the Town of Dannemora in Clinton County, New York, near the community of Lyon Mountain. The facility closed on January 31, 2011.

References

External links  
  NY prison information 

Buildings and structures in Clinton County, New York
Prisons in New York (state)
2011 disestablishments in New York (state)